Shove It is the debut album by UK rock band The Cross. The group was founded and led by Roger Taylor, best known as the drummer for Queen, though he was the rhythm guitarist and lead vocalist for The Cross.

The album features a mix of dance and rock, and can be considered Taylor's third solo album after 1984’s Strange Frontier.

History

Taylor had originally started recording the album with the intention of releasing it as a solo artist. However, he decided to recruit a band and called them The Cross. Most of the album had been completed prior to recruiting the band members, with Taylor playing much of the instrumentation.

The album features Queen members Freddie Mercury (singing lead vocals on "Heaven for Everyone"), Brian May (playing lead guitar on "Love Lies Bleeding") and John Deacon (playing bass guitar on a few tracks), who collaborated with Taylor on the album.

Reception

The album was poorly received by fans and critics and reached only the bottom of the charts, peaking at 58 at the UK Albums Chart. After two weeks it dropped off the chart. In the US, it failed to chart at all.

Track listing
All songs written by Roger Taylor.

UK version
Side 1
"Shove It" – 3:28
"Cowboys and Indians" – 5:53
"Contact" – 4:54
"Heaven for Everyone" (Freddie Mercury on lead vocals) – 4:54

Side 2
"Stand Up for Love" – 4:22
"Love on a Tightrope (Like an Animal)" - 4:49
"Love Lies Bleeding (She Was a Wicked, Wily Waitress)" – 4:25
"Rough Justice" – 3:22

CD bonus track
"The 2nd Shelf Mix" – 5:50
 Hidden Track - 4:58 Track Ends Outro Of Rough Justice Starts at 0:45

Note: The 2nd Shelf Mix is an extended remix of the track "Shove It".  On UK CD pressings it also includes the hidden outro of "Rough Justice".

US version
"Love Lies Bleeding (She Was a Wicked, Wily Waitress)" – 4:25
"Shove It" – 3:28
"Cowboys and Indians" – 5:53
"Contact" – 4:54
"Heaven for Everyone" (Roger Taylor on lead vocals) – 4:54 Freddie Mercury on Backing Vocals (Uncredited)
"Feel the Force"* – 3:44
"Stand Up for Love" – 4:22
"Love on a Tightrope (Like an Animal)"
"Rough Justice" – 3:22

Personnel
Roger Taylor - vocals, guitar, keyboards, bass, drums (most instruments on album)
Spike Edney - keyboards, vocals
Clayton Moss - guitar (on some tracks)
Peter Noone - bass guitar (on some tracks)
Josh Macrae - drums (on some tracks)

Additional personnel
Brian May - lead guitar on "Love Lies Bleeding (She Was a Wicked, Wily Waitress)", harmonies on "Bohemian Rhapsody" sampling, and guitar on "Flash" sampling. (uncredited)
Freddie Mercury - lead vocals on "Heaven for Everyone" (U.K./European version, B-side of "Heaven for Everyone" single Europe), backing vocals on "Heaven for Everyone" (US version), and harmonies for "Bohemian Rhapsody"/"Fat Bottomed Girls" sampling. (uncredited)
Gary Barnacle - Tenor, Alto & Baritone Saxophone on "Cowboys and Indians", "Contact" & "Stand Up For Love".

References

Albums produced by David Richards (record producer)
The Cross (band) albums
1988 debut albums
Virgin Records albums